The Warrior and the Sorceress is a 1984 Argentine-American fantasy action film directed by John C. Broderick and starring David Carradine, María Socas and Luke Askew. It was written by Broderick (story and screenplay) and William Stout (story).

The Warrior and the Sorceress is a version of the classic Kurosawa film Yojimbo. The film is notorious for María Socas spending much of the movie topless, along with several other actresses in bit roles displaying varying degrees of nudity. It is also considered by some to be a cult classic.

The Warrior and the Sorceress was the second entry in a series of ten films that Roger Corman produced in Argentina during the 1980s, the first one being Deathstalker.

Synopsis 
In a distant galaxy lies the desert planet of Ura, which has two suns. There, two rival warlords, Zeg and Bal Caz, constantly fight against each other in a battle over the only wellspring in the village of Yamatar. The mercenary warrior Kain emerges and announces that his skills are for hire to the highest bidder. Naja, a beautiful sorceress that has been taken captive by Zeg, changes Kain's original purpose of taking the well for himself to saving Naja and the village people. Kain starts to tangle the situation, taking advantage of the ongoing feud while seeking to debilitate the rival warlords and defeat them.

Cast 
 David Carradine ... Kain the Warrior
 María Socas ... Naja the Sorceress
 Luke Askew ... Zeg the Tyrant
 Anthony De Longis ... Kief, Zeg's Captain (as Anthony DeLongis)
 Harry Townes ... Bludge the Prelate
 Guillermo Marín ... Bal Caz (as William Marin)
 Armando Capo ... Burgo the Slaver (as Arthur Clark)
 Daniel March ... Blather, Bal Caz's Fool
 John Overby ... Gabble, Bal Caz's Fool
 Richard Paley ... Scar-face
 Marcos Woinski ... Burgo's Captain (as Mark Welles)
 Cecilia Narova ... Exotic Dancer (as Cecilia North)
 Dylan Willias ... Zeg's Guard
 José Casanova ... Zeg's Guard (as Joe Cass)
 Miguel Zavaleta ... Zeg's Guard (as Michael Zane)
 Herman Cass ... Zeg's Guard
 Arturo Noal ... Zeg's Guard (as Arthur Neal)
 Hernán Gené ... Zeg's Guard (as Herman Gere)
 Gus Parker ... Zeg's Guard
 Ned Ivers ... Slave
 Liliana Cameroni ... Zeg's Drowned Slave (as Lillian Cameron)
 Eva Adanaylo ... Woman at Well (as Eve Adams)
 Noëlle Balfour ... (uncredited)

Production 
The film was originally scripted as Darksword of Tor, then renamed to Kain of Dark Planet. Corman developed it for Millennium Pictures, the company he formed after he sold New World Pictures. Millennium was subsequently renamed "New Horizons".

The exterior shots were made in Ischigualasto Provincial Park in San Juan, also known as Valle de la Luna ("Valley of the Moon"), due to its otherworldly appearance. Most of the film was shot inside Estudios Baires Film S.A. and Campo de Mayo, in Buenos Aires Province.

During an argument with his girlfriend before production started, David Carradine punched a wall and fractured his right hand. As a result Carradine, who was right-handed, was trained by Anthony De Longis (who was the action and stunts coordinator, and also played the villain Kief) to learn swordfighting with his left hand. To conceal the cast on his hand, Carradine used a pointed black glove on his right arm while filming. In Carradine's memoirs, the actor states he broke his hand three days into filming, but he doesn't say how.

The outfit that Carradine uses for his character of Kain is the same he later wore for the 1991 B movie/post-apocalyptic action film Dune Warriors. In a rather obvious coincidence, Luke Askew again played the antagonist/villain role in the latter film.

Carradine says the director "was obsessed by the body of the actress who played the priestess [María Socas] so he costumed her in a topless outfit. Everywhere you looked there was this barebreasted woman."

Carradine liked the movie because of its sword play and the fighting style he helped design but says "don't expect a great movie" because the director quit during editing after a fight with Corman (which erupted because he had gone two weeks over schedule), meaning the editing was finished by two teams in two different countries. "It's a little uneven", said Carradine of the film.

Similarities with Yojimbo 
According to William Stout, John Broderick asked him to write a sword and sorcery screenplay based on Akira Kurosawa's 1961 Samurai film Yojimbo, which he did, then rewrote to distance the story from that original. After a number of rewrites, Broderick took the script and shopped it around. Several years later, Stout was surprised to hear that Broderick was making a film based on that script, but without Stout's name on it and without paying Stout. Calling up the executive producer, Roger Corman, Stout managed to remedy that situation. However, upon watching the finished product, Stout was further surprised to see that Broderick had reverted much of the script to more closely follow its inspiration.

According to David Carradine's book Spirit of Shaolin, it was clear before production started that the film was going to be a version of Yojimbo, and Carradine talked about it with executive producer Roger Corman:
The Warrior and the Sorceress) was essentially a remake of Yojimbo, the samurai movie by the great Japanese director, Akira Kurosawa. I called up Roger and told him I loved the script; but what about the Yojimbo factor. Roger said, "Yes, it is rather like Yojimbo." I said, "It's not like Yojimbo. It is Yojimbo." Roger said, "Let me tell you a story. When Fistful of Dollars opened in Tokyo, Kurosawa's friends called him up and said 'You must see this picture.' Kurosawa said, 'Yes, I understand it is rather like Yojimbo.' 'No, it's not like Yojimbo, it is Yojimbo. You have to sue these people.' 'I can't sue them', he responded. 'Why not?' 'Because' -Kurosawa confessed-, 'Yojimbo is Dashiell Hammett's Red Harvest.'" I went for it.
The story however appears to be apocryphal, as Kurosawa and Toho Studios did in fact successfully sue Sergio Leone.

Reception
The Philadelphia Inquirer called it "an unashamedly sordid rehashing - and retrashing - of Akira Kurosawa's samurai classic Yojimbo, via Sergio Leone's A Fistful of Dollars, with a little Star Wars and Conan the Barbarian tossed in for good measure."

The Los Angeles Times also noted the similarities to Yojimbo and said the film had "awkward action, a general air of determined viciousness and (Carradine excepted) so much overacting that it sometimes seems that a new dramatic style is being forged."

Footage of the film later turned up in Wizards of the Lost Kingdom II.

References

Sources

External links 
 
 
 
 

1984 films
1984 fantasy films
English-language Argentine films
1980s English-language films
American sword and sorcery films
American remakes of Japanese films
Argentine fantasy films
1980s American films